Leopoldo Di Girolamo (born 11 August 1951 in Montorio al Vomano) is an Italian politician.

He is a member of the Democratic Party and was elected at the Senate of the Republic for two legislatures (XIV, XVI) and at the Chamber of Deputies for the XV legislature in 2006.

Di Girolamo served as Mayor of Terni for two terms (2009-2018) and President of the Province of Terni from 2014 to 2016.

See also
2001 Italian general election
2006 Italian general election
2008 Italian general election
2009 Italian local elections
2014 Italian local elections
List of mayors of Terni

References

External links
 

1951 births
Living people
Mayors of Terni
Presidents of the Province of Terni
Democratic Party (Italy) politicians
Democratic Party of the Left politicians
Democrats of the Left politicians